Payback is a 2023 South Korean television series starring Lee Sun-kyun, Moon Chae-won, Kang Yoo-seok, and Park Hoon. It aired from January 6 to February 11, 2023, on SBS TV's Fridays and Saturdays at 22:00 (KST) time slot.

Synopsis
The series follows the story of people who risk everything to fight the money cartel that colluded with the law. They refuse to remain silent in the face of incompetent and unjust power, and fight passionately in their own way.

Cast

Main
 Lee Sun-kyun as Eun Yong, a money trader who is the owner and head of investment of a global private equity fund.
 Yoon Jeong-il as young Eun Yong
 Moon Chae-won as Park Joon-kyung, a former prosecutor and a military judicial officer who passed the bar exam and graduated from the training institute with top scores.
 Han Dong-hee as young Park Joon-kyung
 Kang Yoo-seok as Jang Tae-chun, Yong's nephew who is a prosecutor.
 Park Hoon as Hwang Ki-seok, a chief prosecutor.

Supporting
 Kim Hong-pa as Myung In-joo, godfather of the underground economy who built a cartel of greed.
 Kim Mi-sook as Yoon Hye-rin, Joon-kyung's mother.
 Seo Jeong-yeon as Eun Ji-hee, Tae-chun's mother and Yong's older sister.
 Park Hwan-hee as young Eun Ji-hee
 Kim Hye-hwa as Hong Han-na, Yong's partner who is a lobbyist-turned-private equity fund representative.
 Choi Deok-moon as Nam Sang-il, a veteran prosecution investigator.
 Choi Jung-in as Ham Jin, a prosecutor at the Supreme Prosecutors' Office.
 Lee Ki-young as Oh Chang-hyun, former chief of the Seoul District Prosecutors' Office.
 Son Eun-seo as Myung Se-hee, In-joo's daughter and Ki-seok's wife.
 Choi Min-chul as Park Jung-soo, the chief prosecutor of the 5th Detective Division.
 Park Jung-pyo as Lee Young-jin, Ki-seok's right-hand man and chief prosecutor of the Seoul Central District Prosecutors' Office.
 Kwon Hyuk as Lee Su-dong, In-joo's partner.
 Won Hyun-joon as Lee Jin-ho, a capital market thug and Yong's old friend from juvenile detention center.
 Kim Kyung-ho as young Lee Jin-ho
 Lee Geon-myung as Kim Seong-tae, In-joo's right-hand man.
 Kwon Tae-won as Baek In-soo, a former prosecutor and a member of the National Assembly.
 Jo Young-jin as Son Seung-jin, a politician.

Extended
 Kim Jae-rok as President Park
 Seo Ji-hoon as Cha Dong-jin

Special appearance
 Lee Jung-bin as Kim Ju-hyeon

Production
Filming was scheduled to begin in July 2022.

Viewership

Notes

References

External links
  
 
 

Korean-language television shows
Seoul Broadcasting System television dramas
South Korean thriller television series
South Korean legal television series
South Korean action television series
South Korean crime television series
Television series about revenge
Television series by Studio S
2023 South Korean television series debuts
2023 South Korean television series endings